Frederick Edgar Dinenage MBE (born 8 June 1942) is an English author and retired broadcaster and television presenter. His television career spanned nearly 60 years, including the long-running children's programme How and ITV's regional programming in the south of England. Dinenage retired from ITV Meridian on 16 December 2021, after 38 years as a news anchor.

Early life and education
Dinenage was born in Birmingham. He was educated at Portsmouth Grammar School (a state grammar school during the time he attended it; it later became an independent school).

Career
Dinenage has appeared as presenter of many British television programmes (many of them produced by Southern Television, and its successors TVS and Meridian Broadcasting), such as Tell The Truth, How and its successor How 2, as well as the BBC quiz show Pass The Buck and Gambit (produced by Anglia).

News anchor 
Dinenage began his career at Southern Television in 1964, as a presenter on Three Go Round, a part-networked children's programme, alongside actress Diane Keen and future television producer Britt Allcroft.

He later moved onto the station's local news magazine programme, Day By Day, as a reporter and presenter. In later years, he concentrated on sports coverage, hosting the programme's weekly South Sport feature.

Dinenage transferred from Southern to TVS in January 1982, chiefly as a sports presenter and reporter, working on Coast to Coast, Sportshow and The Saturday Match. The following year, he took over from Khalid Aziz as the main anchor for the South edition of Coast to Coast, co-presenting alongside Christopher Peacock, Fern Britton, Debbie Thrower and Mai Davies.

After TVS lost its franchise, Dinenage was retained by Meridian as anchor for the South edition of Meridian Tonight and other non-news regional programmes. His co-anchors included Debbie Thrower, Natasha Kaplinsky, Jane Wyatt and Sangeeta Bhabra.

In October 2021, it was announced that Dinenage would step down from ITV, after 38 years as a news anchor in the south of England. His final edition of ITV News Meridian aired on 16 December 2021.

Other work 
Dinenage spent a brief period in the late 1970s covering regional sport for Yorkshire Television. He also appeared as a relief presenter of the networked ITV Saturday afternoon show, World of Sport - a role which earned him an appearance on the children's Saturday show Tiswas. He also has his own weekly column featured on the magazine of the Southampton local newspaper, Southern Daily Echo.

Alongside his television career, Dinenage has written several factual books, including ghosting on autobiographies My Story and Our Story for the Kray twins. He is a keen football follower and was on the board of directors at Portsmouth between 1998 and 2007. He was a team captain on the ITV game show Never Had It So Good, shown in 2002. He also narrated Driver's Eye Views for railway filming company "Video 125".

In February 2014, he celebrated his 50th anniversary as a reporter and presenter with ITV, announcing that he hoped to continue broadcasting into the future. Fred Dinenage: Murder Casebook, a crime documentary series on 20th century murders was first broadcast on the Crime & Investigation Network in 2011. He has also narrated Most Evil Killers for Pick since 2017.

Dinenage was appointed Member of the Order of the British Empire (MBE) in the 2010 Birthday Honours, for services to broadcasting.

On 16 October 2020, it was announced Dinenage would appear in a new series of How, alongside Vick Hope, Sam Homewood and Frankie Vu. A year later in December 2021, Dinenage announced his retirement from ITV Meridian, ending a career that has lasted nearly six decades.

Family
Dinenage's second daughter Caroline (born 1971) is the Conservative Member of Parliament for Gosport (elected at the 2010 general election). 

She also served as the Digital and Culture Minister between February 2020 and September 2021.

References

Further reading

External links
 

Living people
1942 births
English television presenters
British reporters and correspondents
ITV regional newsreaders and journalists
Members of the Order of the British Empire
People from Birmingham, West Midlands
People educated at The Portsmouth Grammar School